Grupo Desportivo e Recreativo Gafetense is a Portuguese football club located in Gáfete, Portugal.

Colours and badge 
Resende's colours are white and blue.

External links 
 Official website
 Soccerway Profile
 Fora de Jogo Profile

Football clubs in Portugal
Association football clubs established in 1979
1979 establishments in Portugal